Marco Candrina (born January 2, 1982 in Pavia) is an Italian professional football player. He currently plays for Pomigliano.

He has played for 4 seasons in the Serie B for A.S. Bari.

External links
 

1982 births
Living people
Italian footballers
Serie B players
Serie D players
F.C. Pavia players
S.S.C. Bari players
Aurora Pro Patria 1919 players
Calcio Foggia 1920 players
Benevento Calcio players
Association football defenders